A Doll's House is a 1922 American silent drama film produced by and starring Alla Nazimova and directed by her husband Charles Bryant. The couple released the film through United Artists. It is based on the 1879 play A Doll's House by Henrik Ibsen with the scenario written by Nazimova under the pseudonym Peter M. Winters. The film was the fourth silent version filmed of the play, being preceded by a 1918 Paramount film directed by Maurice Tourneur. The film is classified as being lost.

Plot
As described in a film magazine, in a slightly modernized version of the story that could take place in any town, Torvald Helmer (Hale) is ill at home, and is ordered by his physician Dr. Rank (De Brulier) to a southern clime. His wife Nora (Nazimova) forges her father's name to a bank note to raise money to save her husband's life. Six years later, when she has but one payment left on the note, Nils Krogstad (Nowell) threatens to expose her unless she intercedes and prevents her husband from discharging him from the bank. Nora begs her husband to have Krogstad remain. Torvald learns her reason for her request and accuses Nora unjustly. When Krogstad returns Nora's note marked "paid," Torvald is overjoyed that his own reputation is saved, and agrees to overlook the past. Nora, however, decides that her first duty is to be a human being and leaves her husband and children. She walks out into the storm and declares that it is "the end and the beginning."

Cast
 Alan Hale as Torvald Helmer
 Alla Nazimova as Nora Helmer
 Nigel De Brulier as Dr. Rank
 Elinor Oliver as Anna
 Wedgwood Nowell as Nils Krogstad
 Clara Lee as Ellen
 Florence Fisher as Mrs. Linden
 Philippe De Lacy as Ivar
 Barbara Maier as Emmy

References

External links

1922 films
American silent feature films
Films based on A Doll's House
Lost American films
1922 drama films
Silent American drama films
American black-and-white films
United Artists films
Lost drama films
1922 lost films
1920s American films